Jewson is a British chain of builders' merchants.

Jewson may also refer to:

 Charles Jewson, chief cashier of the Bank of England
 Charles Jewson (Lord Mayor), Lord Mayor of Norwich, son of Percy and father of Richard
 Dorothy Jewson (1884–1964), British member of Parliament
 Norman Jewson (1884–1975), architect-craftsman of the Arts and Crafts movement
 Percy Jewson (1881–1962), English businessman and National Liberal politician
 Richard Jewson (born 1944), British businessman
 Vicky Jewson (born 1985), English screenwriter and film director